The 1995–96 season was the 86th season of competitive football in Germany.

National teams

Germany national football team

UEFA Euro 1996 qualification

UEFA Euro 1996

Friendly matches

Germany women's national football team

UEFA Women's Euro 1997 qualification

Friendly matches

League season

Men

Bundesliga

2. Bundesliga

Women

Bundesliga

References

 
Seasons in German football